More or Less Live in a Few Different Places is an EP by indie rock band Pinback featuring live-in-studio performances.

Track listing
 "Bbtone" – 3:41
 "Offline PK" – 2:53
 "Talby" – 4:16
 "Tres" – 4:49
 "X I Y" - 3:31
 "Penelope" - 4:273
 "June" - 6:36
 "Rousseau" - 4:45

Pinback albums
2002 EPs